Allens Mills is an unincorporated community in Jefferson County, in the U.S. state of Pennsylvania.

History
Allens Mills (formerly rendered Allen's Mill) was laid out by Jere Allen, and named for him. A post office called Allens Mills was in operation from 1874 until 1928.

References

Unincorporated communities in Jefferson County, Pennsylvania
Unincorporated communities in Pennsylvania